Sara Sviri is an Israeli scholar and translator noted for her research on Sufi mystical thought, an area she has researched since the 1970s and 1980s.

Biography 
Sviri received her doctorate in 1980 from Tel Aviv University. Her doctoral thesis explored the thought of the Sufi master al-Hakim al-Tirmidhi.

She is a professor emerita of the Department of Arabic and the Department of Comparative Religions at the Hebrew University of Jerusalem.

Books 
 Perspectives on Early Islamic Mysticism: The World of Al-Ḥakīm Al-Tirmidhī and His Contemporaries (2003)
 The Taste of Hidden Things: Images on the Sufi Path (1997)

References

External links 
Interview with Sara Sviri

Place of birth missing (living people)
Year of birth missing (living people)
Living people
Academic staff of the Hebrew University of Jerusalem
Israeli translators
Tel Aviv University alumni

Women scholars of Islam